Academic regalia in the United States has a history going back to the colonial colleges era. It has been most influenced by the academic dress traditions of Europe. There is an Inter-Collegiate Code that sets out a detailed uniform scheme of academic regalia that is voluntarily followed by many, though not all institutions entirely adhere to it.

Elements

Gowns and robes 

Bachelor's and master's gowns in the United States are similar to some of their counterparts in the United Kingdom, particularly Oxford. The main differences are that the bachelor's gown is designed to be worn closed and that the sleeves of the modern gown are square at the end instead of pointed as the Code calls for. The master's gown sleeve is oblong and, though the base of the sleeve hangs down, it is square-cut at the rear part of the oblong shape.  The front part has an arc cut away, and there is a slit for the wrist opening (which before 1960 was located at the elbow as on British gowns), but the rest of the arc is closed. The shape is evocative of the square-cut liripipe incorporated into many academic hoods.  The master's gown is designed to be worn open or closed.

Doctoral gowns are typically black, although some schools use gowns in the school's colors. The Code calls for the outside shell of the hood to remain black in that case.  Doctoral gowns have bell sleeves with three velvet bands on them and velvet facing on the front of the gown.  The Code calls for the gown trim to be either black or the color designated for the field of study in which the doctorate is earned, with the proviso that the degree of Doctor of Philosophy (Ph.D.) uses the dark blue velvet of philosophy regardless of the particular field studied.  (For example, a Ph.D. in theology would wear velvet gown trim in dark blue, a Doctor of Theology (Th.D.) would wear scarlet trim, or either might choose black.) Some gowns expose a necktie or cravat when closed.  They are designed to be worn open or closed in the front.

Members of the Board of Trustees or other governing body officers of a college or university, regardless of their degrees, are entitled to wear doctor's gowns, faced only with black velvet and black velvet bars on the sleeves.  However, their hoods (see, below) may be only those of the degree actually held by the wearer (or one specially prescribed by the institution).  The color standardization for the outside shell of the hood as black provides flexibility of use and helps facilitate this practice.

Hoods 

The hood's coloring and size represents the type and subject of degree earned, as well as the institution from which it was awarded. Though no shape is specified in the Code, American bachelors and masters usually wear the Wales simple shape ([s5] in the Groves classification system) with a split salmon cut; doctors wear the same shape but with "panels" attached to the sides.

 Shell – The Code calls for the shell material of the hood to match the robe, and for the color to be black regardless of the color of the robe being worn.
 Interior lining – The interior lining, generally satin, is worn so as to display the colors of the institution from which the wearer received the degree; if more than one color is used, they are usually in the pattern of chevrons or equal divisions.
 Trim – The outer edge of the cowl (around the opening if one would put it over one's head if wearing it as an actual hood) is trimmed in velvet or velveteen. The width of the trim is 2 inches, 3 inches, and 5 inches for the bachelor's, master's, and doctoral degrees, respectively. In most American colleges and universities, the color of the velvet hood trimming is distinctive of the academic field, or as closely related as possible, to which the degree earned pertains.  For instance, one who has earned a Master of Arts in Journalism would wear velvet trim of crimson to signify "journalism", rather than white to represent "arts". Trim colors should not be combined or displayed together in any way to attempt to indicate more than one academic field.
 Length – The length of the hood will vary with the level of academic achievement as well: bachelors wear a 3 foot length, masters a 3.5 foot length, and doctors a 4 foot length.  Generally only doctoral hoods are made with the cape or panels at the sides of the hood that lie cape-like across the back.

Candidates may have the hood ceremoniously placed upon them, as is done at some British universities, or a college or school may 'self-hood' en masse at the appropriate time during the ceremony. Additionally, the Code allows for the wearing of the hood into the commencement ceremony as part of the academic procession, but only if neither of the two procedures above are being employed.  The Code also states: "It is quite appropriate for the bachelor's gown to be worn without a hood."  Many institutions, particularly larger ones, have therefore dispensed with the bachelor's hood at commencement ceremonies altogether, though a graduate is still entitled to wear one once the degree is conferred.  Both honorary and earned doctoral degrees are very often conferred by the highest academic officer of an institution bestowing the appropriate hood at the podium, regardless of the procedure being followed for other candidates at the ceremony.

Only one hood should be worn at any given time.  The regalia indicating the highest degree attained is usually worn, though the Code seems to allow for a graduate to revert for some occasion to the entire academic costume of a lesser degree earned. Those who hold multiple degrees of the same level (i.e. more than one master's or doctorate degree) may wear at any given time the regalia, in its entirety, of any one degree earned. The Code does not allow for 'mixing-and-matching.'  The one exception is for officers of the academic institution who, while wearing a doctoral gown of the University being served, may display one hood from any degree earned from any institution (see Academic robes, above).

Headwear 

Headwear is an important component of cap-and-gown, and the academic costume is not complete without it. The headwear may vary with the level of academic achievement and, to some extent, on the individual academic institution's specifications.

 Caps – The mortarboard cap is recommended in the Code, and the material required to match the gown, with the exception that doctoral regalia can instead use a velvet four-, six-, or eight-sided tam, but the four-sided mortarboard-shaped tam in velvet is what the Code seems to recommend here; the only color called for is black, in all cases  During graduation ceremonies in the United States, both women and men wear caps, and both women and men wear their caps indoors throughout most of the ceremony, except for men during a baccalaureate service, the national anthem ("The Star-Spangled Banner"), any benediction that may be offered by a chaplain or other authority, and sometimes the singing of the alma mater if the local custom requires it. Although military and civil uniform, national dress, and clerical garb etc. are worn beneath the academic robe, traditionally only the biretta in conjunction with clerical garb will replace the academic cap.  All other costumes forgo the normal headwear in favor of the appropriate academic version.
 Tassel – The tassel worn on the mortarboard or a tam seems to provide, by tradition, the greatest opportunity for latitude in American academic dress. It has been black, or represented the university's colors, or the colors of the specific college, or the discipline. The tassel has also been used to indicate membership in national honor societies or other awards. However, strictly speaking, the Code states that "The tassel should be black or the color appropriate to the [academic] subject," and only makes an exception for the gold tassel, which is reserved for those entitled to wear the doctoral gown. Only one tassel is worn at a time.

There is at some colleges and universities a practice of moving the tassel from one side to the other on graduating, but this is a modern innovation that would be impractical out of doors due to the vagaries of the wind. However, this mark of transition to graduate status has the benefit of taking less time than more traditional indicators such as the individual conferring of the hood or a complete change of dress part-way through the ceremony (as at Oxford in the United Kingdom). In such universities it is common for undergraduates to begin the commencement ceremony with their tassels on the right. Switching the tassel to the left may be done individually or as a group. For doctoral and masters students, the tassel commonly begins and remains on the left.

Other adornments 
A number of other items such as cords, stoles or aiguillettes representing various academic achievements or other honors are also worn at the discretion of some degree-granting institutions.  The Code disapproves of their use on or over academic regalia, saying that"...shoes and other articles of visible apparel worn by graduates should be of dark colors that harmonize with the academic costume. Nothing else should be worn on the academic gown."Apparel and tokens representing awards and honors are not considered a component of academic dress, not only because the Code suggests avoiding them, but also because (a) they are often worn without the defining cap and gown, and (b) they are usually not worn by a graduate with academic robes after the Commencement year in which the honor was awarded. Nevertheless, they are often seen with academic regalia in the United States, and are therefore mentioned here.

 Medals/medallions – When worn about the neck, medals/medallions may not be in conflict with the Code if worn beneath the hood and visible only with the gown open. The Code's exception is only for special regalia for a chief marshal, the university or college president, etc. which may include medallions or other devices symbolic of the office. As a medallion in this case is symbolic of the office and not academic achievement, once the wearer leaves the office they are no longer entitled to wear it.  Therefore, it is not a component of an individual's academic regalia, but a component of the regalia for the office.
 Honor cord – Honor cords usually consist of twisted cords with tassels on either end. They are sometimes awarded for various academic achievements, or to members of honor societies. Often, cords come in pairs with a knot in the middle to hold them together. Sashes, stoles, or medallions are also awarded in place of cords. Any of these items are customarily worn with non-academic attire, as well. With cap and gown, and hood when utilized, some educational institutions have permitted these cords to complement the regalia of a high school or university candidate, ignoring the ACE Code to the contrary.  Unlike hoods, tassels and stoles, custom allows more than one cord to be worn at the same time.

Intercollegiate colors 
The colors allocated to the various fields of learning have been largely standardized in the United States by the Intercollegiate Bureau of Academic Costume, and accepted by the American Council on Education in its Academic Costume Code.  The color assigned to a given hood trim and/or tassels and—where appropriate—gown facings, should be as closely related as possible to the field studied. For example, one who has earned a degree in animal husbandry would wear the maize of agriculture, as no color is specific to the subject of animal husbandry, and it is generally included within the broader field of agriculture.  Less simply, mathematics is traditionally among the liberal arts, which are represented by white, but can also be considered a formal science, represented by golden yellow for science.

The codified colors associated with the different academic disciplines are as shown below:

The code calls for a graduate to display the color of the subject of the degree obtained, not the degree itself. For example, if a graduate is awarded a Bachelor of Arts (BA) degree in business, the trimming should be drab, representing commerce/accountancy/business, rather than white, representing the broader arts/letters/humanities; if the BA were in economics, the trim would be copper; if in environmental studies, it would be russet, and so on. If the BA were in a language, a subject within the humanities and not otherwise assigned a unique color, the velvet would indeed be white.  Similarly, if a Bachelor of Science (BS) degree is awarded for physics, the velvet trim should be golden yellow, representing physics as one of the natural sciences; however, if the BS were in engineering, the trim would be orange, or if in education, the trim would be light blue. The same method is true of master's degrees and doctorates: a Master of Public Administration in Science and Technology should show trim of golden yellow for science, not peacock blue for public administration; conversely a Master of Science in Public Administration should display peacock blue trim for public administration and not golden yellow for science.

Additionally, it is problematic when a field of study that does not have its own color assigned to it has been considered to be included in more than one discipline, which are represented by different colors. For example, history has traditionally been considered as among the humanities, represented by white, but is also considered a social science, which can be represented by golden yellow.  This is often addressed by an academic institution allowing the degree earned to influence - but not determine - color assignment.  For instance, a Bachelor of Arts graduate in history might display white, while a Bachelor of Science graduate in history at the same institution could properly display golden yellow, and vice versa.  This then can create confusion in the first instance by appearing to display colors based on the degree earned rather than, as stipulated in the Code, the academic field studied.

In 1986, the American Council on Education updated the Code and added the following sentence clarifying the use of the color dark blue for the Doctor of Philosophy degree, which is awarded in any number of fields:"In the case of the Doctor of Philosophy (Ph.D.) degree, the dark blue color is used to represent the mastery of the discipline of learning and scholarship in any field that is attested to by the awarding of the degree, and it is not intended to represent the field of philosophy."The doctorate other than the Ph.D. will be represented by the colors indicated above. For example, the Doctor of Education (Ed.D.) in Public Health should display salmon pink for public health, not light blue for education, and the Doctor of Public Health (DrPH) in Public Administration should display peacock blue for public administration, not salmon pink for public health. The Doctor of Engineering (D.Eng.) degree, if no further specialization was made, should be represented by orange, and the Doctor of Ministry (D.Min.) by scarlet if no further specialization, etc.

History

Colonial period 
The practice of wearing academic regalia in what is now the United States dates to the Colonial Colleges period, and was heavily influenced by European practices and styles. Students at the  College of New Jersey (now Princeton University) and at King's College (now Columbia) were required to wear their "college habits" at all times starting in 1755 at Princeton and in 1763 at Columbia. Shortly after the beginning of the nineteenth century, however, academic dress was rarely worn on a daily basis, according to contemporary sources.

19th century 
After the American Civil War, academic dress was generally only worn at ceremonies or when representing the institution, although in some instances the practice has persisted, such as at Sewanee, where members of one student society continue to wear the gown to class.

Although universities that adopted academic dress assigned specific meanings to them, there was no consistency among the various sets of rules. For example, when the University of Pennsylvania adopted its academic dress statute in April 1887 it abolished hoods. Instead, it assigned eight faculty colors that were shown on the gowns’ yokes.

Columbia adopted an academic dress statute in December of that year.  It included the first known American inclusion of the three velvet stripes on the sleeves. Both doctors and masters wore black gowns with sleeve stripes and facing; for masters the velvet was always black, and for doctors the velvet was always purple. Columbia also approved a scarlet gown for doctors’ use on “festal” occasions. Earlier, three stripes adorned the sleeve of a gown depicted in an invitation to Class Day ceremonies at Columbia in 1865.

When New York University adopted its own academic dress in 1891, like Columbia it added the three sleeve stripes but permitted them to be worn in the university’s faculty colors. It also adopted the Edinburgh shape in the ([s4] in the Groves classification system) for its hoods. Although NYU gave up this shape when the Code was adopted, Harvard adopted it for all its graduates in 1902.

Also starting in 1891, Princeton graduates wore a black gown with an orange stripe between the shoulders, making it perhaps the first American gown in a university’s corporate colors.

These weren't the only pre-Code gowns in America that departed from black. Hampden-Sydney started using gray gowns in 1893, and the University of the South approved gowns for its higher degrees in the same shapes and colors of Oxford. However, since the university at the time conferred only honorary master’s and doctoral degrees, it's unknown if anyone ever wore the Oxford-style gowns.

Intercollegiate Code on Academic Costume 

In June 1893, the trustees of Princeton appointed one of their members, John J. McCook, to look into creating an academic costume that showed the wearer’s degree, faculty, and alma mater, and to discuss the concept with Columbia, Yale, Harvard and other universities with the goal being “the adoption of a uniform academic costume.”

Columbia hosted the meeting with delegates from Princeton (McCook), Yale and New York University attending, and as a “technical adviser” Gardner Cotrell Leonard, whose Albany, N.Y., firm manufactured academic dress. (Harvard waited until 1902 to adopt its academic dress statute, which is recognizable for its inclusion of the university’s nineteenth-century crows’ feet and the use of the Edinburgh simple shape hood [s4]). The meeting took place in either 1894 or 1895 and adopted the Intercollegiate Code of Academic Costume on March 16, 1895. The Code was based on Columbia’s existing statute, and prescribed the cut and style and materials of the gowns, as well as eight colors representing fields of learning. The descriptions, however, are vague compared to the descriptions of academic costume in Europe. For example, no particular shape of hood was specified in the Code (nor has one ever been). The version Americans typically wear is the Wales simple shape [s5] with a split-salmon cut. In the late nineteenth century it was the shape worn by Oxford bachelors; today it is worn by graduates of the University of Wales.

Since 1895, several changes have been made to the Code.

20th century

1932 
In 1932 the American Council on Education (ACE) authorized the appointment of a committee "to determine whether revision and completion of the academic code adopted by the conference of the colleges and universities in 1895 is desirable at this time, and, if so, to draft a revised code and present a plan for submitting the code to the consideration of the institutional members of the Council." The committee essentially adopted the Code in whole and changed it in two ways:

 The master’s hood shrank from four feet to three-and-one-half feet; and
 The chevron was added to the Code to be used in the hood lining when more than one color appeared.

1959 
A Committee on Academic Costumes and Ceremonies, appointed by the American Council on Education in 1959, again reviewed the academic dress code and made several changes. They took effect as of 1960. The significant alterations included:

 Moving the arm slit on the master’s gown sleeve from above the elbow to the wrist;
 Specifying that the arc cut from the master’s gown sleeve was in the front;
 Permitting masters’ and doctors’ gowns to be worn either closed or opened;
 The first connection of color to discipline instead of faculty (i.e. a Master of Science in Agriculture wears maize, not golden yellow);
 Adding soft, square caps for women as an alternative to the mortarboard;
 Tassels in colors other than black; and
 The suggestion that hoods be worn by candidates for the degrees they were about to receive (so that they would not have to be hooded individually).

These changes were approved in March 1959. In April, the Committee approved the use of maroon for home economy. The color has never been included in any edition of the ACE book.

As part of the socio-political upheaval of the 1960s in many Western cultures, eschewing academic regalia became a popular means of demonstrating anti-establishment views, particularly in response to the Vietnam War and the Civil Rights Movement in the United States. Student protests, which had the effect of cancelling graduation ceremonies at some American universities, led to a general relaxing of protocols on academic attire and ceremonial pageantry. After the war, academic regalia continued to be shunned by some who considered it a symbol of elitism.  However, since the 1980s, academic regalia has been in resurgence.  Some colleges or academic departments allow graduating students to vote on whether or not to wear academic regalia at graduation ceremonies.

1973 
More changes were approved by the Committee in 1973, following the “large numbers of requests for advice about academic dress” received by the Committee. The important changes, which first appeared in the 11th edition of the ACE book (published in 1973), include:

 Permitting for associates’ degrees a “flat shield hood,” which properly speaking is a cape, and which was first used by Columbia for its bachelors and doctors in 1963;
 Permitting for six-year specialist degrees, such as the Master of Arts in Teaching, a hood whose length was 3 feet 9 inches (which is halfway between the master’s 3-foot, 6-inch hood and the doctor’s 4-foot hood), and whose edging was 4 inches wide (which is halfway between the three inches for masters and five inches for doctors); and
 The addition of an “alternate color” for Business, Accountancy and Commerce: Sapphire blue. Its use was recommended against in the description, and no explanation for its addition was mentioned.

The 11th edition also included a contradiction in selecting a faculty color. Since 1960 the color was to be connected not to the title of the degree but to the discipline studied (e.g. a Bachelor of Arts in Music would wear pink, for music, instead of white etc.). That suggestion remained in the 11th edition, but in another paragraph was the opposite direction: “For the hood, the border [i.e. the edging of the cowl] should be white if the degree is awarded in arts (B.A. or M.A.), golden yellow if in science (B.S. or M.S.).”

Doctors had similarly confusing advice. Interdisciplinary doctorates could wear the faculty color of any of a number of fields. “Thus,” the 1973 Code states, “urban affairs may be distinguished by copper (economics), peacock blue (public administration), or another field already assigned ...”

1987 
Doctoral degrees were clarified in 1987 when all Ph.D. graduates were to wear dark blue as their faculty color. While this was the most visible of changes that took effect that year, it was hardly the only one, and it wasn't the only change that involved color. Some of the other changes included:

 Dropping the specification of material for the gown and hood (it had been cotton, silk or rayon);
 Eliminating sapphire blue as an alternative color for Commerce, Accountancy and Business;
 Removing the women’s soft, square cap as an alternative to the mortarboard;
 Pointing out that “[n]othing else should be worn on the academic gown” aside from the prescribed costume;
 Omitting the light blue gown for the Associate of Arts in teacher education, while leaving grey gowns as the suggestion for all associates’ degrees.

Rules vs guide 
Although readers of the Code may believe it to be an enforceable edict, the current version of the Code points out its permissive nature: “… it is impossible (and probably undesirable) to lay down enforceable rules with respect to academic costume. The governing force is tradition and the continuity of academic symbols from the Middle Ages. The tradition should be departed from as little as possible … ” In addition, the Committee wrote a memo in 1967 that makes the point directly, pointing out that “the general guidelines are as stated and should not be interpreted as supported by highly detailed and hard-and-fast regulations on file in some central place.”

21st century 
Although today in the U.S. academic dress is rarely worn outside commencement ceremonies or other academic rituals such as encaenia and baccalaureate services, those graduation ceremonies have gained in popularity and have expanded to high school graduations, middle school, elementary school and even kindergarten graduation ceremonies.

Special academic regalia of United States universities 
More than 400 universities in the U.S. grant the doctoral degree. Of them, more than 125 use academic dress for their doctors that varies from the guidelines found in the code. Some universities limit their unique costumes for doctors only; others provide it for doctors and masters; some provide it for the upper degrees and bachelors too.

Unique academic dress typically separates itself from the Code's standards through color. While the Code sanctions black for gowns at the bachelor's level and above (and grey gowns for the associate degree), several American colleges in the late nineteenth century had adopted colored academic dress (see History, above). When the Code was approved in 1895, black became the only sanctioned color for gowns, caps, and hood shells.

As early as 1912, however, uniformity was challenged when Brown adopted mortarboards for its trustees and fellows in the university color, seal brown. In 1938 Yale began using Yale blue gowns for its masters' and doctors' academic dress.

In 1950 Syracuse began using orange gowns for its academic officers, but not for graduates. Rochester created a red gown for its president and a black gown with gold trim for some of its officers in 1954. In the next year, Harvard adopted crimson for the gowns of its Ph.D. holders. (Later, all Harvard doctors but the J.D. would wear the crimson gown; today, only research doctors may wear the crimson gown.)

Other Ivy League universities soon followed suit. Princeton adopted a doctoral gown in 1960 whose shape differed slightly from the Code's standard. The sleeves were somewhat shorter and they were lined in orange; the gown was black with orange trim. The standard shape was recently authorized by Princeton; both are permitted today. Columbia debuted its light blue gowns for all graduates in 1963, following failed attempts in 1948 and 1958 to adopt colored gowns. The gowns Columbia has used since 1963, designed by Jacques Barzun, have a pair of crowns below the yoke; on the bachelor's and master's gown they are embroidered onto a tab while they are embroidered directly into the velvet facing of the doctoral gown. Pennsylvania's distinctive doctoral gown was first used in 1964. It is red but the lower ends of the sleeves are blue.

Deviations from the Code generally fall into one of five categories. Referring to doctoral gowns, these are:

 Adding piping, usually in the university color, around the velvet trim on a black gown;
 Changing the velvet trim to the university color;
 Changing the gown to the university color;
 Changing both the color of the gown and the color of the velvet trim to other than black or faculty color; or
 Changing the shape of the gown and/or its trim (e.g. Stanford and Stony Brook University).

See also 

 Academic dress
 Academic regalia of Columbia University
 Academic regalia of Harvard University
 Academic regalia of Stanford University

Further reading 

 
 
 
 
 .

References 

Regalia